is a Japanese actress, voice actress and singer from Tokyo, Japan who is currently affiliated with Axlone. 

She has played a variety of characters, from young girls to women and boys, and is particularly good at voicing attractive, strong, and big-sisterly women. In her leading roles, she often voiced boys, and has also done the voice of a mother. She also played the voice of Hagu-Hagu, a strange creature who only says "Hagu-Hagu" in the TV series Haō Taikei Ryū Knight. In recent years, she has voiced Shizuka's mother in Doraemon, and has also provided the Japanese dub voice for Jessica Rabbit in Who Framed Roger Rabbit.

Biography
After moving on from high school in 1982, Orikasa graduated from the drama department of the Nihon Denshikōgakuin College (now Nihon Kogakuin College). After performing on stage as an actress with the Bungeiza Theater Company and the Sōhen Theater Company, she participated in an audition for the TV series Little Lord Fauntleroy out of a desire to broaden her work. After several rounds of auditions, she made her debut as a voice actress in 1988, playing the main character, Cedie. According to Orikasa, Minami Takayama and Megumi Hayashibara were the other finalists in the audition for the role of Cedie, and Orikasa says that she was chosen for the role of Cedie because of her innocence rather than her acting ability.

Her stage name, "Ai Orikasa," implies her wish to be loved by everyone. The staff went to the restroom while thinking of her stage name, and came up with it.

In the early days, she appeared in many works of Nippon Animation. Especially in the World Masterpiece Theater, she was one of frequently appearing voice actors like Kazue Ikura, Ginga Banjō, Ken'ichi Ogata, etc.; next to "three major voice actors" Mitsuko Horie, Eiko Yamada and Keiko Han.

Of all the characters she has played in anime, she cites Ryōko from the Tenchi Muyo! series as her most memorable character. She has also dubbed for dramas, movies, and animation produced overseas, and has been active as a singer among other things.

At the end of September 2011, it was announced that she had left Production Baobab, where she had belonged for many years since her debut, and moved to Axlone, Toshiyuki Morikawa's agency.

Filmography

Television animation
1988
Little Lord Fauntleroy (Cedric Errol (Cedie))
Mister Ajikko (Maurice)

1989
Madō King Granzort (Kabbi(ep 16), Musa(ep 36))
Aoi Blink (Julie)
Time Travel Tondekeman (Arthur, June, Andre)
Jungle Book: Boy Mowgli (Lala)
Momotaro Densetsu (Pochi's Dog, Otohime)
Wrestler Gundan Seisenshi Robin Jr. (Mashi Raimeru)

1990
Idol Angel Yokoso Yoko (Nagai Maria)
Chibi Maruko-chan (Maruo's Mother, Hamaji, Mari Uesugi)
Kyatto Ninden Teyandee (Pururun)
Tenku Senki Shurato (Matsuri)
Mashin Eiyuden Wataru 2 (Arukidemesu)
Knights of Ramune & 40 (Tereyan, Cham)
Karasu Tengu Kabuto (Kurosaten)
Edokko Boy: Gatten Taro (Oryu)
Pygmalio (Kurt)

1991
Ore wa Chokkaku (Jun)
Jankenman (Jankenman)
Moero! Top Striker (Mario Santis, Sophia Ruggiero)
Yokoyama Mitsuteru Sangokushi (Diaochan, Emperor Xian of Han(Young))
Marude Dameo (Tonma, Catherine, Sayuri)

1992
Oniisama E... (Shinobu Hikawa's Lover)
Flower Witch Mary Bell (Ken)
Genki Bakuhatsu Ganbaruger (Koutarou Kirigakure)
Tenchi Muyo! (Ryoko)
Tetsujin 28-go FX (Yoko)
Ashita e Free Kick (Morita Mirei)
Yu Yu Hakusho (Koto, Shizuru Kuwabara)

1993
Mobile Suit Victory Gundam (Fuala Glifon, Ness Husher)
Heisei Inu Monogatari Bow (Butcher's Wife)

1994
Lord of Lords Ryu Knight (Hagu Hagu)
Yamato Takeru (Kushinaga)
Crayon-shinchan (Akemi Matsuda)
Metal Fighter Miku (Ginko)
Blue Seed (Ryoko Takeuchi)
Captain Tsubasa J (Kazuo Tachibana)

1995
Romeo and the Black Brothers (Romeo)
Kyōryū Bōkenki Jura Tripper (Ajari)
Juu Senshi Garukiba (Ryuto)
Mobile Suit Gundam Wing (Quatre Raberba Winner)
Mojako (Sorao Amano)
Tenchi Universe (Ryoko)

1996
B'tX (Miisha)
Saber Marionette J (Baikou)

1997
Shin Tenchi Muyo (Ryoko)
Maze (Solude "Whirlwind" Schfoltzer)
Revolutionary Girl Utena (Kanae Ōtori)
Kindaichi Shounen no Jikenbo (Seiko Kayama (ep 4-6), Yurie Kazekura (ep 16-17), Yuko Wakabayashi (ep 115))
Battle Athletes Victory (Yumiko Karashima)
Virus Buster Serge (Donna Dorado)
Gall Force: Revolution (Pfizer)

1998
Nessa no Haou Gandalla (Yang Mimei)
Momoiro Sisters (Sakura Murakami)
PopoloCrois Monogatari (Pietro)
St. Luminous Mission High School (Tadeku Umi)
Saber Marionette J to X (Baiko)
Super Yo-Yo (Inseto Hojo)

1999
Ojamajo Doremi (Lala)
Steel Angel Kurumi (Dr. Reiko Amagi)

2000
Gensomaden Saiyuki (Lianjie)
Sakura Wars (Ayame Fujieda)
Ojamajo Doremi Sharp (Lala)
Vandread (Meia's Oma)
Gravitation (Tohma Seguchi)

2001
Bakuten Shoot Beyblade (Max Mizuhara)
Motto! Ojamajo Doremi (Lala)
Vandread: The Second Stage (Meia's Oma)
Captain Tsubasa: Road to 2002 (Young Jun Misugi)

2002
Mirage of Blaze (Yukio Takeda)
Bakuten Shoot Beyblade 2002 (Max Mizuhara)
Tenchi Muyo! GXP (Ryoko)
Ojamajo Doremi Dokkan!! (Lala)
Kiddy Grade (Timothy Constance)

2003
Inuyasha (Jakotsu)
Ghost in the Shell: Stand Alone Complex (Sanou)
Bakuten Shoot Beyblade G Revolution (Max)
Rumiko Takahashi Anthology (Matsuko Kogure)
Planetes (Fee Carmichael)
Mermaid Forest (Isago)

2004
Windy Tales (Kaito)
Futakoi (Miyabi Hinagiku)
Black Jack (Debit)

2005
Sgt. Frog (Sylvie)
Gallery Fake (Marian)
Kaiketsu Zorori (Angel)
Doraemon (Shizuka's mom)
Kouchuu Ouja Mushiking: Mori no Tami no Densetsu (Kidamu)
Moeyo Ken (Yuuko Kondou)
Boku no Bokugo (Narrator)

2006
Hell Girl (Aki Abe)
Demonbane (Nya)
Detective Conan (Mitsuhiko Tsuburaya) (Episodes 425-436)
Silk Road Kids (Yuto)
Oban Star-Racers (Nin)
Super Robot Wars OG: Divine Wars (Shiro)
KenIchi the Mightiest Disciple (Saori Shirahama)

2007
Touka Gettan (Landlady)
Kono Aozora ni Yakusoku o (Naoko Asakura)
Claymore (Galatea)
Toward the Terra (Mother Computer)
Blue Drop (Azanael)
You're Under Arrest: Full Throttle (Fortune Teller)
Ryūsei no Rockman Tribe (Orihime)

2008
Porfy no Nagai Tabi (Michael Balbattsua)
Penguin no Mondai (Kurisu Yamaguchi)
Kaiba (Moka)
The Telepathy Girl Ran (Junpei Tokita)
Koihime Musou (Kashin)
Noramimi 2 (Furiotto)

2009
Casshern Sins (Hoto)
The Sacred Blacksmith (Lucy)
Kaidan Restaurant (Girl in the White House)

2010
Nura: Rise of the Yokai Clan (Hari Onna)
Shiki (Chizuru Kirishiki)
Super Robot Wars OG: The Inspector (Mai Kobayashi, Shiro)

2011
Dog Days (Mother Fox Spirit)
A-Channel (Tōru's mother)
Sket Dance (Boy (ep 18))
Maria Holic Alive (Mariya Irene)
C3 (Zenon Hōjō)

2012
Natsume's Book of Friends (Amana)
Senki Zesshō Symphogear (Flower's Aunt)
Saint Seiya Omega (Peacock Pavlin)
Tanken Driland (Lasetsu)
My Little Monster (Kyoko Misawa)

2013
Monogatari Series Second Season (Araragi Mother)
One Piece (Momonosuke)

2014
PriPara (Mireille's Mother)
Wasimo (Mom)

2015
Blood Blockade Battlefront (K.K.)

2017
Tsugumomo (Honoka)

2020
Fruits Basket: 2nd Season (Ren Sōma)

2021
Fruits Basket: The Final (Ren Sōma)

OVA
Tenchi Muyo! Ryo-Ohki (1992) as Ryoko/Zero
Domain of Murder (1992) as Ranko Yotawara
Tenchi Muyo! Mihoshi Special (1994) as Ryoko
801 T.T.S. Airbats (1994) as Arisa Mitaka
Battle Skipper (1995) as Sayaka Kitaouji
Magical Girl Pretty Sammy (1995) as Ryoko Orikasa
Miyuki-chan in Wonderland (1995) as Cheshire Cat
Blue Seed Beyond (1996) as Ryoko Takeuchi
Gall Force: The Revolution (1996) as Pfizer
Variable Geo (1996) as Jun Kubota
Mobile Suit Gundam Wing: Endless Waltz (1997) as Quatre Raberba Winner
Mobile Suit Gundam Wing: Operation Meteor (1997) as Quatre Raberba Winner
Fire Emblem (1997) as Mars (young)
Saber Marionette J Again (1997) as Baiko
Sakura Wars (1997) as Ayame Fujieda
Gravitation: Lyrics of Love (1999) as Tohma Seguchi
Angel Sanctuary (2000) as Alexiel
Street Fighter Alpha: The Animation (2000) as Rose
Sakura Wars: Sumire (2002) as Kaede Fujieda
Kidou Shinsengumi Moeyo Ken (2003) as Yuuko Kondou
Ojamajo Doremi Naisho (2004) as Lala
Phantom - The Animation (2004) as Lizzie Garland
Saikano: Another Love Song (2005) as Mizuki
Super Robot Wars Original Generation: The Animation (2005) as Shiro and Mai Kobayashi/Levi Tolar
Tales of Symphonia: The Animation (2007) as Genius Sage

Films
Floral Magician Mary Bell: The Key of Phoenix (1992) as Ken
Tenchi the Movie: Tenchi Muyo in Love (1996) as Ryoko
Tenchi the Movie 2: The Daughter of Darkness (1997) as Ryoko
Mobile Suit Gundam Wing: Endless Waltz ~Special Edition~ (1998) as Quatre Raberba Winner
Tenchi Forever! The Movie (1999) as Ryoko
Doraemon: Nobita's Winged Heroes (2001) as Mom Gusuke
Sakura Wars: The Movie (2001) as Kaede Fujieda
Beyblade: The Movie (2002) as Max Mizuhara
Detective Conan: The Phantom of Baker Street (2002) as Hiroki Sawada
One Piece: Chopper's Kingdom on the Island of Strange Animals (2002) as Momabi
Detective Conan: The Private Eyes' Requiem (2006) as Mitsuhiko Tsuburaya
Stand by Me Doraemon 2 (2020) as Shizuka's mom
Doraemon: Nobita's Little Star Wars 2021 (2022) as Shizuka's Mom

Tokusatsu
Garo (2005) as Madou Necklace Silva
Zyuden Sentai Kyoryuger (2013-2014) as Funfilled Spy Luckyulo (eps. 1 - 34, 36 - 48) (voice)/old lady disguise (ep. 40) (actor)
Zyuden Sentai Kyoryuger: Gaburincho of Music (2013) as Luckyulo
Zyuden Sentai Kyoryuger vs. Go-Busters: The Great Dinosaur Battle! Farewell Our Eternal Friends (2014) as Luckyulo
Zyuden Sentai Kyoryuger Returns: Hundred Years After (2014) as Apprentice Wise Goddess Luckyuro
Zero: Black Blood (2014) as Madou Necklace Silva
Ressha Sentai ToQger vs. Kyoryuger: The Movie (2015) as Luckyulo
Power Rangers Dino Force Brave (2017) as Funfilled Spy Luckyulo 
Zero: Dragon Blood (2017) as Madou Necklace Silva
Zyuden Sentai Kyoryuger 「Brave 33.5: This is Brave! Battle Frontier」 (2018) as Funfilled Spy Luckyulo

Drama CDs
Kami-Kaze (????) as Kaede
Mobile Suit Gundam Wing: Blind Target (????) as Quatre Raberba Winner

Video games
Astal (1995) as Astal
Magical Drop F (1995) as Empress and Strength Jr.
Super Robot Taisen 4S (1995) as Shiro
Mega Man 8/Rockman 8 (1996) as Rockman (Mega Man)
Sakura Wars (1996) as Ayame Fujieda
Other Life: Azure Dreams (1997) as Nico Southey
Sakura Wars Hanagumi Taisen Columns (1997) as Ayame Fujieda
Sakura Wars Steam Radio Show (1997) as Ayame Fujieda
Super Robot Wars F (1997) as Shiro
Bulk Slash (1997) as Naira Savage
Daraku Tenshi - The Fallen Angels (1998) as Musuashu (Yuiren)
Sakura Wars Teigeki Graph (1998) as Ayame Fujieda/Kaede Fujieda
Sakura Wars 2 (1998) as Kaede Fujieda
Super Robot Wars Final (1998) as Shiro
Super Adventure Rockman (1998) as Rockman (Mega Man)
Super Robot Taisen Complete Box (1999) as Shiro
Valkyrie Profile (1999) as Aimee, Genevieve, Clair, Miriya and J.D. Warris
Phantom of Inferno (2000) as Lizzie Garland
PopoloCrois Story II (2000) as Prince Pietro
Sakura Wars Hanagumi Taisen Columns 2 (2000) as Kaede Fujieda
Super Robot Taisen Alpha (2000) as Shiro and Levi Tolar, Quatre Raberba Winner
Project Justice (2000) as Zaki
Sakura Wars 3 (2001) as Kaede Fujieda
Sakura Wars 4 (2002) as Kaede Fujieda
Tokimeki Memorial Girl's Side (2002) as Tsukushi
Cyber Troopers Virtual-On Marz (2003) as Silvie and SHBVD Sergeanr Leddon
Sakura Wars: In Hot Blood (2003) as Ayame Fujieda
Tales of Symphonia (2003) as Genis Sage
Rumble Roses (2005) as Anesthesia/Dr. Anesthesia
Namco x Capcom (2005) as Saya and Kyuujuukyuu
PopoloCrois Story: Adventure of Prince Pietro (2005) as Prince Pietro
Sharin no Kuni, Yuukyuu no Shonenshojo (2005) as Ari Ruruliant Houzuki
3rd Super Robot Wars Alpha: To the End of the Galaxy (2005) as Mai Kobayashi, Quatre Raberba Winner
Another Century's Episode 2 (2006) as Quatre Raberba Winner
Valkyrie Profile: Lenneth (2006) as Aimee, Genevieve, Clair, Miriya, and J.D. Warris
Rumble Roses XX (2006) as Anesthesia/Dr. Anesthesia
Super Robot Wars: Original Generations (2007) as Shiro and Mai Kobayashi/Levi Tolar
Super Robot Wars Original Generation Gaiden (2007) as Shiro and Mai Kobayashi
Super Robot Wars OG Saga: Endless Frontier (2008) as Saya
Suiloden Tierkreis (2008) as Shams
Super Robot Wars OG Saga: Endless Frontier EXCEED (2010) as Saya
Super Robot Wars Z/2 (2011) as Quatre Raberba Winner
Project X Zone (2012) as Ayame and Saya
Project X Zone 2 (2015) as Ayame, Saya, Tarosuke
Return to PopoloCrois: A Story of Seasons Fairytale (2015) as Prince Pietro
Granblue Fantasy (2014) as Lady Grey
PopoloCrois Story Narcia's Tears and the Fairy's Flute (2018) as Prince Pietro
Dissidia Final Fantasy: Opera Omnia as Freya Crescent
Sin Chronicle (2021) as Violet

Dubbing

Live-action
Absentia as Julianne Gunnarsen (Natasha Little)
The Adventures of Greyfriars Bobby as Ewan Adams (Oliver Golding)
Captain America as Bernice Stewart / Sharon (Kim Gillingham)
Godsend as Adam Duncan (Cameron Bright)
The Good Son as Henry Evans (Macaulay Culkin)
Home Alone as Kevin McCallister (Macaulay Culkin)
Jingle All The Way (2000 Fuji TV edition) as Jamie Langston (Jake Lloyd)
Marley & Me: The Puppy Years as Marley (Grayson Russell)
The Nutty Professor as Carla Purty (Jada Pinkett)
The Poseidon Adventure as Susan Shelby
Power Rangers in Space as Astronema (Melody Perkins)
Power Rangers Lost Galaxy as Karone/Pink Ranger (Melody Perkins)
RoboCop 2 as Hob (Gabriel Damon)
Sleepless in Seattle as Jonah Baldwin (Ross Malinger)
The Sound of Music (50th Anniversary edition) as Sister Agatha (Doreen Tryden)

Animation
Aladdin as Whahido
Batman: The Animated Series as Young Dick Grayson/Robin
Darkwing Duck as Honker Muddlefoot
Widget (Widget, additional voices)
Mr. Bogus as Brattus and Additional Voices
Rugrats as Tommy Pickles

Selected discography
Shukujo Choutokkyu [淑女超特級]
Moonlight Café
Room Service
Mitsumete [みつめて]
I
Truth
LeTTer
BREATH
Popolocrois Monogatari

References

External links
  
  
 
 Ai Orikasa at Hitoshi Doi's Seiyuu Database
 Ai Orikasa at Ryu's Seiyuu Info
 
 
 

1963 births
Living people
Japanese women pop singers
Japanese video game actresses
Japanese voice actresses
Japanese stage actresses
Production Baobab voice actors
Singers from Tokyo
Voice actresses from Tokyo
20th-century Japanese actresses
20th-century Japanese women singers
20th-century Japanese singers
21st-century Japanese actresses
21st-century Japanese women singers
21st-century Japanese singers